The Little Brown Jugette is an American harness racing event for three-year-old fillies run annually since 1971 at the Delaware County Fairgrounds racetrack in Delaware, Ohio. It is the counterpart to the Little Brown Jug for colts.

History 
In the 2003 race, Numeric Hanover won as a result of the disqualification for interference of Odds On Charmaine, who had finished first but set back to fifth.

Call Me Queen Be won the first heat of the 2016 Jugette in a world record time for three-year-old pacing fillies. Hall of Fame driver John Campbell guided L A Delight to a win in the second heat to earn the overall Jugette title and in so doing broke his own record for most wins with his fifth Jugette. Similarly, Hall of Fame trainer Robert McIntosh earned his third win, tying him with Billy Haughton for most Jugette victories.

Records 
 Most wins by a driver
 5 – John Campbell (1985, 1989, 1992,1998, 2016)

 Most wins by a trainer
 3 – Billy Haughton (1974, 1984, 1985)
 3 – Robert McIntosh (1992, 1994, 2016)

 Stakes record
 1:50 1/5 –  Call Me Queen Be (2016 - 1st heat)

Little Brown Jugette winners

References

Recurring sporting events established in 1971
Harness races for three-year-old pacers
Tourist attractions in Delaware County, Ohio
Horse races in Ohio
1971 establishments in Ohio